Litovsky is a surname. Notable people with the surname include:

 Dina Litovsky (born 1979), Ukrainian-born photographer
 Valentin Litovsky (1921–1941), Soviet actor